David Epstein is an American journalist. He is the author of two books, Range: Why Generalists Triumph in a Specialized World (2019) and The Sports Gene: Inside the Science of Extraordinary Athletic Performance (2013). Both books were New York Times best sellers.

Epstein was previously an investigative reporter at ProPublica. Prior to ProPublica, Epstein was a senior writer at Sports Illustrated, where he specialized in science issues in sports and investigative reporting. With his colleague Selena Roberts, Epstein broke the story that the Yankees' Alex Rodriguez tested positive for steroids in 2003.

Life 
Epstein is a graduate of Columbia University, where he earned a bachelor's degree in environmental science and astronomy (2002) and master's degrees in environmental science and journalism.

Epstein is married and has a son.

Works

References

External links 
 
 
 
Review of Range in The Objective Standard

American sports journalists
Columbia College (New York) alumni
Living people
1980 births